Skylark Airport  is located in Warehouse Point, Connecticut, United States.

Facilities and Aircraft
Skylark Airport is situated two miles east of the central business district, and contains one runway.

For the 12-month period ending April 30, 2008, the airport had 16,190 aircraft operations, an average of 46 per day: 93% local general aviation, 6% transient general aviation, <1% air taxi, and <1% military. At that time there were 71 aircraft based at this airport: 99% single-engine and 1% multi engine.

References

Airports in Hartford County, Connecticut
East Windsor, Connecticut